Leslie Edward Pridgen (born August 6, 1978), better known by his stage name Freeway, is an American rapper known as a member of the rap group State Property, during his time with Roc-A-Fella Records alongside Jay-Z. In 2009, Freeway was briefly signed to Cash Money Records, but returned to work again with Jay-Z at the mogul's entertainment organization and record label, Roc Nation, with his 2018 album Think Free.

Life and career

Early life and career beginnings
Freeway was born Leslie Pridgen on August 6, 1978. He adopted his moniker from the name of the infamous drug trafficker "Freeway" Rick Ross as he found no one wanted to listen to a rapper named Leslie. Freeway began his career by participating in freestyle battles in his high school and met fellow Philadelphia native Beanie Sigel, while rapping on stage at a hometown nightclub. Not long after being signed to Roc-A-Fella Records, Sigel put in a word for Freeway, who made his first appearance on The Dynasty: Roc La Familia, on the track "1-900-Hustler" with Sigel, Jay-Z, and Memphis Bleek. After the appearance, Jay-Z signed him to a deal; he was featured on "Think it's a Game", also alongside Jay-Z, on Sigel's second album The Reason. In 2001, he underwent a notorious freestyle battle with then-unsigned rapper Cassidy, hosted by Swizz Beatz and lost with a unanimous judges decision.

Philadelphia Freeway (2003)
On February 25, 2003, Freeway released his debut album, Philadelphia Freeway. The album was produced primarily by Roc-A-Fella-affiliated beatsmiths Just Blaze, Bink!, and Kanye West and featured a large number of Roc-A-Fella rappers. Many of them also hailed from Philadelphia, and were soon compiled into the group State Property led by Freeway and Beanie Sigel. The album had two singles, the biggest hits of Freeway's career thus far: "What We Do", featuring Jay-Z and Beanie Sigel, for which a video was released showcasing most of the Roc's roster at the time, and "Flipside", featuring State Property member Peedi Crakk; both records were produced by Just Blaze. The album also sold over 500,000 units in the United States.

State Property problems and Ice City (2004–2006)
After Jay-Z's "retirement" album and the uncertainty over what direction the label was headed, Beanie Sigel was convicted and jailed on a charge of attempted murder. Relations between Beanie Sigel and State Property soured after the incarceration of Sigel, and State Property essentially broke up, with Sigel stating he was unsure he would work with them again. Over the next few years, members of the group—most notably Freeway and Sigel themselves—slowly began collaborating once again, though members such as Oschino and Peedi Crakk fell out of the loop. During this time, with his crew and label in turmoil, Freeway turned to his Muslim faith. With uncertainty in the air, Freeway put together another Philadelphia-based crew called Ice City, named after their North Philly neighborhood. While active, the group consisted of Face Money, Bars and Hydro, with Freeway playing a major mentoring role. Their debut album, Welcome to the Hood, was released under Sure Shot Recordings, but received little attention. Subsequently, groupmember Hydro released a mixtape dissing Freeway, distancing himself and the group from its founder.

Free At Last and departure from Roc-A-Fella (2007–2009)
 In response to his crisis of faith, Freeway went on hiatus for a few years, making his Hajj, a journey to the holy city of Mecca, required by every Muslim at least once in his or her lifetime if they are able.  Upon his return, Freeway recorded his second album Free at Last, which was released on November 20, 2007. Jay-Z and 50 Cent were both set to co-executive produce the album; while both were featured, the project ended up solely a Roc-A-Fella release, with 50 giving up his co-executive producer's role. The first single was "Roc-A-Fella Billionaires", featuring Jay-Z, which leaked to the internet; the second single, and first official single, was "Lights Get Low" featuring Rick Ross and Dre of the production team Cool & Dre. As the album featured no production from either Kanye West or Just Blaze, who together produced the lion's share of his debut, Freeway lashed out at them in his lyrics, generating rumors that he and his former producers had unresolved differences. After the album's release, Freeway went on record to clarify his comments, saying he had no real animosity towards them and that he had only been speaking his mind. The album eventually sold over 100,000. In 2008, Freeway initiated what he called the Month of Madness, releasing a song a day for the month of December. The songs, featuring input from Phoe Notes, Erick Sermon, Don Cannon, Cardiak, Jake One, Oddisee and others, were later compiled into a mixtape. The year 2009 brought an announcement that he would be working on his third album amidst his regrets over hearing Jay-Z had stepped down as Def Jam president. Shortly afterward, the rapper announced his release from Def Jam, which distributed a now defunct Roc-A-Fella Records, and that his next album would be titled The Stimulus Package, produced by Jake One and released by Rhymesayers Entertainment.

Philadelphia Freeway 2 and record deals (2009)
A project titled Philadelphia Freeway 2 was released on the independent label Real Talk Entertainment on May 19, 2009. The first single, "Finally Free", was released on iTunes on April 14, 2009. Freeway also made an original song "Car Jack" for the 2009 game Grand Theft Auto: The Lost and Damned. On March 19, 2009, he performed at SXSW.  Freeway released his mixtape "The Beat Made Me Do It" on November 13, 2009, which featured production by veteran producer Jake One with assistance by Don Cannon to officially announce his 2010 Rhymesayers debut album The Stimulus Package. Rhymesayers and Freeway leaked the first official track and video, "Know What I Mean" off of The Stimulus Package on December 1, 2009.

In June 2009, Freeway had confirmed a deal with Cash Money Records, and the start of his own label, Free Money. Following this, he put out a few mixtape tracks speaking of the deal, including "Touchdown" and "All Night Long". 

Freeway, speaking on that label deal and his relationship with Jay-Z:
"I been fucking with Cash Money," he said in an interview. "You know, me and Wayne did a joint for the last album, but we couldn't get the shit cleared in time and all that. We just throwing around some ideas. And I'm launching a label, Free Money, so what better home for it...My man Ceelo, he worked with Baby, so he really basically connected us like that. But, right now everything is still in preliminary...It's still Roc-A-Fella for life. That's something that's not going to leave me...Everything still preliminary. Jay give me his blessing with whatever I want to do. Jay want to see niggas making moves."

Diamond In the Ruff (2010-2014)
In a video interview with KarmaloopTV in 2010, Freeway announced a new clothing line in the works titled "Freestyle". In addition to the new clothing line, Free also announced an album called Diamond In The Ruff which featured production from Jake One, Bink!, Needlz and Just Blaze. Freeway explained in the interview that the album should have come after Philadelphia Freeway. Diamond In the Ruff was released November 27, 2012, and featured collaborations with Rick Ross and Black Thought. Freeway recorded an EP with Statik Selektah which was completed in 24 hours. It was called the Statik-Free EP and was released on iTunes on January 11, 2011.

Freeway also released a collaboration in 2014 with DJ mashup artist Girl Talk, an EP called Broken Ankles, which included stylistic attributes that would normally be included in transitions between Girl Talk segments.

Free Will and health scare (2015-2017)
In 2015, Freeway was diagnosed with kidney failure, and as a result, wrote about dealing with the experience on his 2016 album, Free Will, which he released independently. He began what became a three-year wait for a kidney transplant, and currently serves as the official ambassador for the Kidney Foundation. On Free Will, frequent Nas collaborator L.E.S. produced "Kane & Abel," and Girl Talk produced "Addiction," "Always Love You" and "First Things First." G-Unit's Young Buck has a feature spot on "We Thuggin."

Think Free and the return to the Roc (2018–2019)
After years away, Freeway returned to working with Jay-Z at his entertainment company called Roc Nation. Under this umbrella, Freeway's sixth solo album, Think Free, was released June 22 on that record label, and the 13 songs include cameos from Lil Wayne, Lil Uzi Vert, Jadakiss, BJ The Chicago Kid, Fat Joe, Faith Evans and more. The first singles released were "All Falls Down," "All the Way Live" and "Blood Pressure," the latter with Wayne.

Accompanying the 2018 release of Think Free, Freeway is set to release the "Think Free" documentary, a video account of his health from the diagnosis of kidney failure, family life, his music and more with a behind-the-scene look. The rapper underwent a kidney transplant in February 2019.

Discography

Studio albums
 Philadelphia Freeway (2003)
 Free at Last (2007)
 Philadelphia Freeway 2 (2009)
 Diamond in the Ruff (2012)
 Free Will (2016)
 Think Free (2018)

Collaboration albums
 2002: State Property OST (with State Property)
 2003: The Chain Gang Vol. 2 (with State Property)
 2010: The Stimulus Package (with Jake One)
 2010: The Roc Boys (with Beanie Sigel)
 2011: Statik-Free (with Statik Selektah)
 2014: Highway Robbery (with The Jacka)
 2014: Broken Ankles (with Girl Talk)

Mixtapes
 G-Unit Radio Part 19: Rep Yo Click (2006)
 The Beat Made Me Do It (2009)
 The Intermission (2011)
 The Black Santa EP (2012)
 Freedom of Speech (2012)
 Fear of a Free Planet (2016)

Video games
Def Jam Fight for NY (2004) as himself
Def Jam Fight for NY: The Takeover (2006) as himself

References

External links

 
 Twitter
 Instagram
 Facebook
 HipHopGame Interview 
 Uncensored Freeway Radio Interview 2010 

Rappers from Philadelphia
1979 births
Roc Nation artists
Living people
African-American male rappers
21st-century American rappers
Gangsta rappers
African-American Muslims